Toon Goggles is an American on-demand entertainment service for children that provides animated cartoons, live-action shows, games and music worldwide via the web and mobile applications on smartphones, OTT devices, smart TVs and tablets, led by CEO and co-founder Stephen Hodge.

Based in Los Angeles, CA, Toon Goggles has developed partnerships with  Sony, Samsung and Roku. Their children's content is compliant with COPPA (Children's Online Privacy Protection Act).

Toon Goggles allows animators to publish their shows for free. Animation rights holders are then provided with analytical data regarding the popularity of each show that they can present to network producers and/or investors.

In December 2014, Toon Goggles introduced 4K streaming of 18 series within their service.

Features 
Many of Toon Goggles customers use the service on children's tablets, especially Techno Source's Kurio7 and Oregon Scientific's MEEP! 
Some Features Include:
6 show categories including boys, girls, action, comedy, preschool, and educational
6 game categories including arcade, puzzle, sports, action, strategy and adventures
News stories and educational content for kids and tweens
TG Radio, a kid-safe music service with pop hits and soundtracks
Parental control switch to monitor viewing
UHD 4K streaming
Access over 3G/4G/Wi-Fi and ability to save cartoons for offline viewing
Localized interface in 18 different languages for global use

Background
The Toon Goggles application is developed by Toon Goggles Inc., a start-up based in Los Angeles.  In 2011, a demo website (www.toongoggles.com) was created to take to MIPCOM to show animation companies the exposure they could receive by placing their cartoons on the Toon Goggles service. The mobile application was created soon after. In 2012, the platform secured one of its first partnerships with Panasonic to appear on the VIERA Connect television. Toon Goggles has been pre-installed and promoted on a variety of devices for sale.

Stephen L. Hodge, Managing Director, spearheaded the creation of Toon Goggles in 2011. James R. Cahall, Chief Technology Officer, heads the service's technology development and feature integration, including the company's move to offer 4K streaming.  Jordan Warkol, Director of Business Development was an actor for 15 years starting at the age of 4 playing 'Froggy' in the 1994 version of "The Little Rascals.".

Business model
Originally a free service, Toon Goggles now follows the Freemium model, offering users free content with pre-screened advertising and the ability to upgrade to the subscription service with an ad-free model.

Partners
Toon Goggles has the following partnerships.
Samsung
 Panasonic
Sharp Aquos
 Sony
Roku
Western Digital
Vizio
Wide Open West
Seiki
 KD Interactive
 Techno Source
 Oregon Scientific
Netrange
Southern Telecom
Hisense
Idolian Mobile
Nook
U.S. Cellular
 Other Partners:
PacketVideo

References

External links
 Official Website
 Informational Website

Video on demand services